Chandrapur railway station (station code: CD) is a railway station serving Chandrapur city in Chandrapur district of Maharashtra state of India. It is under the Nagpur CR railway division of Central Railway zone of Indian Railways. It is located on the New Delhi–Chennai main line of Indian Railways.

, 105 passenger trains stop each day at this station.

History
The year of construction of the railway station is not recorded. The Ramagundam–Balharshah–Wardha–Nagpur sector of the line was electrified in 1988–89.

Amenities
Amenities at Chandrapur railway station include: computerized reservation office, waiting room, retiring room, vegetarian and non-vegetarian refreshments, and a book stall.

Gallery

References

External links
 Arrivals at Chandrapur India Rail Info

Nagpur CR railway division
Railway stations in Chandrapur district